Lisa Emelia Svensson is a Swedish diplomat. Between 2016 and 2019, she was head of the oceans branch at the UN Environment Programme. She was previously her country's ambassador for Ocean.

Life
Svensson and her four siblings were brought up in a rural environment that was focused more on the sea than on their home in Bohuslän. Bohuslän lies the most western part of Sweden, bordering Norway.

Svensson has a doctorate in business administration and political economy. In 2002, she joined Sweden's diplomatic service, working in America and Belgium. She was previously a diplomat-in-residence with a focus on climate change while at Johns Hopkins University. In 2008, she published Combating Climate Change: A Transatlantic Approach to Common Solutions. The book described the state of progress informed by a 2007 conference "California-European Dialogue on Climate Change."

She led the European communities negotiations regarding sustainable development aspects of agreements with ASEAN, MERCOSUR and China.

She was the Ambassador for Corporate Social Responsibility in her country's Ministry for Foreign Affairs. Later she was Sweden's Ambassador for the Ocean being responsible for government advice on international ocean related issues.

Svensson was the head of the oceans branch at UN Environment Programme from 2016 to 2019. She was based in Nairobi in Kenya.

References

Living people
Year of birth missing (living people)
Swedish diplomats
United Nations officials